Tokyo After Dark is a 1959 American drama film directed by Norman T. Herman, written by Norman T. Herman and Marvin Segal, and starring Michi Kobi, Richard Long, Lawrence Dobkin, Paul Dubov, Teru Shimada and Bob Okazaki. It was released in February 1959, by Paramount Pictures.

Plot
A military policeman accidentally kills a Japanese teenager and attempts to escape Japanese authorities.

Cast        
Michi Kobi as Sumi Fujita
Richard Long as Sgt. Robert Douglas
Lawrence Dobkin as Maj. Bradley
Paul Dubov as Jesse Bronson
Teru Shimada as Sen-Sei
Bob Okazaki as Store Proprietor 
Carlyle Mitchell as Mr. Johnson
Frank Kumagai as Nakamura
John Brinkley as 2nd G.I.
Edo Mita as Kojima
Lowell Brown as 1st G.I.
Don Keigo Takeuchi as Toshio
Jerry Adler as Sgt. Williams

References

External links
 

1959 films
American drama films
1959 drama films
Paramount Pictures films
Films set in Tokyo
Japan in non-Japanese culture
1950s English-language films
1950s American films